Jur nad Hronom is a village and municipality in the Levice District in the Nitra Region of Slovakia.

History
In historical records the village was first mentioned in 1276.

Geography
The village lies at an altitude of 145 metres and covers an area of 15.189 km². It has a population of about 940 people.

Ethnicity
The village is approximately 55% Slovak, 43% Magyar and 2% Czech.

Facilities
The village has a public library a gym and soccer pitch.

Genealogical resources

The records for genealogical research are available at the state archive "Statny Archiv in Nitra, Slovakia"

 Roman Catholic church records (births/marriages/deaths): 1654-1903 (parish B)
 Reformated church records (births/marriages/deaths): 1785-1901 (parish A)

See also
 List of municipalities and towns in Slovakia

External links
https://web.archive.org/web/20080111223415/http://www.statistics.sk/mosmis/eng/run.html
Surnames of living people in Jur nad Hronom

Villages and municipalities in Levice District